Escape by Night is a 1953 British crime film directed and written by John Gilling.

Plot
Tom Buchan (Colleano) is an alcoholic journalist whose once memorable work has been destroyed by his constant drunken antics that have cost him his future.  Buchan boasts to his colleagues that they report news, whilst he makes it. He sees a chance for redemption by getting the life story of Gino Rossi (James), an Italian crime boss on the run.  He wins Rossi's confidence by tipping him off to the police coming to arrest them (after Buchan himself tipped off the police).

The highly suspicious Rossi promises Buchan the rights to his life story as they hide out in an abandoned theatre in return for Buchan, a former pilot, flying him to Italy.  Through his nightclub singer girlfriend Rosetta, Rossi becomes suspicious that his brother Guillio plans to take over his gang.  They are discovered by a young boy playing games by himself in the theatre with Buchan telling the boy they are Secret Service Agents and enlist the child as a junior secret agent to bring them food, supplies and deliver Buchan's stories to his editor and messages to Rosetta.

Due to Buchan's disappearance his editor places a £500 reward in the media for news of the two men.

Cast
Bonar Colleano .....Tom Buchan
Andrew Ray .....Joey Weston
Sid James .....Gino Rossi
Ted Ray .....Mr. Weston
Simone Silva .....Rosetta Mantania
Patrick Barr .....Inspector Frampton
Peter Sinclair .....MacNaughton
Avice Landone .....Mrs. Weston
Ronald Adam .....Tallboy
Eric Berry .....Con Blair
Martin Benson .....Guillio

Harry Towb ....Reporter (uncredited)

Critical reception
TV Guide wrote that the "Plot moves fast enough to make viewers forget the plot holes."

References

External links

1953 films
1953 crime drama films
British crime thriller films
British black-and-white films
British crime drama films
Films set in London
1950s English-language films
1950s British films